Seo-gu, or "Western District," is the name of a gu in several South Korean cities:

 Seo-gu, Busan
 Seo-gu, Daegu
 Seo-gu, Daejeon
 Seo-gu, Gwangju
 Seo-gu, Incheon

Lists of places sharing the same name